Valentin Vasilyevich Sysoyev (born in 1887; died in 1971) was a Russian football player.

Career
In 1908, Sysoyev was introduced to football at age 22, while at his parents' dacha in Rastorguevo a visiting Englishman explained the rules to his neighbors. Sysoyev would be one of the first players at newly-formed "ZKS" football club in the Zamoskvorechye District of Moscow.

International career
Sysoyev played his only game for Russia on September 14, 1913 in a friendly against Norway and scored a goal in a 1:1 tie.

References

External links
  Profile

1887 births
1971 deaths
Russian footballers
Russia international footballers
Association football forwards